Jules Angst (born 11 December 1926) is a Swiss academic who is Emeritus Professor of Psychiatry at Zurich University in Zurich, Switzerland, and Honorary Doctor of Heidelberg University in Heidelberg, Germany.

Early life
Angst was born in Zurich, where he also grew up. He completed his medical and psychiatric training in Zurich under his mentor, Professor Manfred
Bleuler (son and student of Eugen Bleuler).  From 1969 to 1994, Jules Angst was Professor of Clinical Psychiatry in the University of Zurich Medical School and Head of the Research Department of Zurich University Psychiatric Hospital (the Burghölzli).

Jules Angst has continued uninterrupted his epidemiological and clinical research at the University (Universitatsklinik) since leaving his Chair.  He has remained the President of the European Bipolar Forum since 2003.

His scientific contributions include 15 books (as author and/or editor), 154 book chapters, and 539 journal articles.

Awards
Jules Angst has received many awards in recognition of his work, including the Anna Monika Awards
(1967/1969), Paul Martini Prize for Methodology in Medicine (1969), Otto Naegeli Prize (1983), Eric Stromgren Medal (1987), the Emil Kraepelin Medal of the Max Planck Institute, Munich (1992), the Jean Delay Prize of the World Psychiatric Association (2017), and the Wilhelm Griesinger Medal of the DGPPN (German Association for Psychiatry, Psychotherapy and Psychosomatics (2018).

Other awards include the Selo Prize NARSAD/Depression Research, USA (1994), Mogens Schou Award for Research in Bipolar Disorder, USA (2001), Burgholzli Award for Social Psychiatry (2001), the Lifetime Achievement Award of the International Society of Psychiatric Genetics (2002), Lifetime Achievement Award of the European Bipolar Forum (2006), the Wagner-Jauregg Medal (2007), ECNP Lifetime Achievement Award in Neuropsychopharmacology (2012), Lifetime Achievement Award of the American Foundation for Suicide Prevention (2013), and the Joseph Zubin Award  of the American Psychopathological Association (2015).

Further reading
Angst J (2009) "From psychoanalysis to epidemiology: autobiographical notes" Acta Psychiatrica Scandinavica 119:87–97  
Fink M (2009) Editorial: "Remembering the lost neuroscience of pharmaco-EEG" Acta Psychiatrica Scandinavica 1–13

References

External links
Laudatio für Professor Dr. med. Dr. med. h.c. Jules Angst 

1926 births
Living people
Physicians from Zürich
Swiss psychiatrists
University of Zurich alumni
Academic staff of the University of Zurich
Presidents of the European Psychiatric Association